Shifu or sifu (师父 or 师傅) is a Chinese title for a teacher or skilled tradesman.

Shifu may also refer to:

The Final Master (Shifu), 2015 Chinese film
Liu Shifu (劉師復), Chinese anarchist and Esperantist, sometimes mononymously known as Shifu
Master Shifu, character in the Kung Fu Panda franchise
Shifu (Stargate), recurring character in Stargate SG-1
Shifu Road (市府路), major thoroughfare in Xinyi District, Taipei, Taiwan
ShiFu, a browser-based massively multiplayer online role-playing game made by 37Games
 Sifu, a character played by Askir Zakareah Khan in the British web series Corner Shop Show
 Sifu (video game), a 2022 action-adventure video game